The Nachingwea Medal is a medal awarded by the government of Mozambique in recognition of extraordinary merit. It is named after the southern Tanzania town of Nachingwea, which was the main base of Frelimo during the Mozambican War of Independence.

Notable recipients 
 Alberto Chissano (1982)
 José Craveirinha (1985)
 Malangatana Ngwenya (1984)

References 

Orders, decorations, and medals of Mozambique